Katakado Dam is a gravity dam on the Tadami River  west of Aizubange in the Fukushima Prefecture of Japan. It was constructed between 1951 and 1953 for the purpose of hydroelectric power generation. It supplies a 57 MW power station with water.

See also

Yanaizu Dam – located upstream

References

Dams in Fukushima Prefecture
Hydroelectric power stations in Japan
Dams completed in 1953
Dams on the Tadami River
Energy infrastructure completed in 1953
1953 establishments in Japan
Gravity dams